The 1975 Aryamehr Cup (Persian: جام آریامهر ۱۳۵۳) was a men's professional tennis tournament played on outdoor clay courts at the Imperial Country Club in Tehran in Iran. It was part of the 1975 Commercial Union Assurance Grand Prix as a Group AA category event. The tournament was held from 20 October through 26 October 1975. Eddie Dibbs won the singles title.

Finals

Singles
 Eddie Dibbs defeated  Iván Molina 1–6, 6–4, 7–5, 6–4
 It was Dibbs' 1st title of the year and the 5th of his career.

Doubles
 Juan Gisbert, Sr. /  Manuel Orantes defeated  Bob Hewitt /  Frew McMillan 7–5, 6–7, 6–1, 6–4
 It was Gisbert's 6th title of the year and the 18th of his career. It was Orantes' 4th title of the year and the 18th of his career.

References

External links
ITF tournament edition details

Aryamehr Cup
Aryamehr Cup